Cheyne Anderson, better known mononymously as Cheyne, is an American R&B singer who was still a teenager when her song "Call Me Mr. Telephone (Answering Service)" hit number one on the U.S. Hot Dance Club Play chart in 1985. She also contributed to the Weird Science soundtrack with the song "Private Joy".

The Madonna single "Into the Groove" was originally written by Madonna as a song to be performed by Cheyne.

See also
List of number-one dance hits (United States)
List of artists who reached number one on the US Dance chart

References

External links
Official Myspace page

African-American women singer-songwriters
American rhythm and blues musicians
American dance musicians
Living people
1970 births
Singers from Los Angeles
21st-century African-American people
21st-century African-American women
20th-century African-American people
Singer-songwriters from California
20th-century African-American women